Like It or Not is a compilation album by American alternative rock band Caroline's Spine. Having parting ways with Hollywood Records, the band returned to their independent origins with this album. Some of the tracks are live recordings and one, "Moby Stick," is a drum solo by Jason Gilardi. Most tracks are available on previous albums, and this recording was largely intended to provide fans who may not have had a chance to acquire older albums to purchase a compilation album.

Track listing
All songs written by Jimmy Newquist.
 "Like it or Not"  – 2:48
 "Drift Away"  – 3:16
 "Overlooked"  – 3:45
 "Know Me at All"  – 3:36
 "Palm O' Mine"  – 4:15
 "Much Better"  – 2:53
 "Million Years"  – 4:54
 "Ouch"  – 3:54
 "Trippin' Laces"  – 4:22
 "Moby Stick"  – 1:33
 "Jumpship"  – 3:50
 "As I am"  – 5:07
 "Hold My Hand"  – 4:38
 "My World"  – 3:10
 "Forget"  – 3:37
 "Think About Me"  – 3:48
 "She's Coming Home"  – 4:06
 "On the Ground"  – 2:23
 "61"  – 5:05
 "Surprise"  – 1:59

Band Lineup
Jimmy Newquist - vocals, guitar, bass
Mark Haugh - guitar, backing vocals
Jason Gilardi - drums and percussion
Scott Jones - bass, backing vocals

2000 compilation albums
Caroline's Spine albums